Sybra epilystoides is a species of beetle in the family Cerambycidae. It was described by Breuning and de Jong in 1941.

References

epilystoides
Beetles described in 1941